Matthew Dayes (born September 3, 1994) is a former American football running back. He played college football at NC State. He was drafted by the Cleveland Browns in the seventh round of the 2017 NFL Draft.

Early years
Dayes attended and played high school football at Cypress Bay High School.

College career
Dayes attended and played college football at NC State from 2013–2016. He had a particularly strong collegiate debut against Louisiana Tech with 17 carries for 84 rushing yards and three rushing touchdowns in the 40–14 victory. Overall, in his freshman season, he had 63 carries for 252 rushing yards and four rushing touchdowns to go along with 10 receptions for 173 receiving yards and one receiving touchdown. In the 2014 season, he showed off some versatility by finishing with 104 carries for 573 rushing yards and eight rushing touchdowns to go along with 32 receptions for 321 receiving yards and five receiving touchdowns. He handled some kick return duties with 21 kick returns for 384 net yards. In the 2015 season, he had 134 carries for 865 rushing yards and two rushing touchdowns to go along with 24 receptions for 172 receiving yards. In his final collegiate season in 2016, he had 249 carries for 1,166 rushing yards and ten rushing touchdowns to go along with 32 receptions for 271 receiving yards.

Collegiate statistics

Professional career
Coming out of NC State, Dayes was projected to be selected in the fifth or sixth round by the majority of NFL draft experts and scouts. He received an invitation to the NFL Combine, but was limited to only the vertical jump, broad jump, and bench press. On March 20, 2017, he participated at NC State's Pro Day and completed all of the positional drills and required combine drills he missed at the combine. Scouts and team representatives from 22 NFL teams attended NC State's Pro Day, to scout Dayes, Jack Tocho, Josh Jones, and nine others. Dayes was ranked as the 16th-best running back prospect available in the draft by NFLDraftScout.com.

Cleveland Browns
The Cleveland Browns selected Dayes in the seventh round (252nd overall) of the 2017 NFL Draft. He was the last running back to be selected in the draft that year. He signed his four-year rookie contract with the Browns on May 10, 2017, a deal reportedly worth $2.46 million.

He competed with Brandon Wilds and Terrence Magee throughout training camp for the Browns' third running back job on their depth chart. Head coach Hue Jackson named Dayes as the Browns' third running back to begin the regular season, behind veterans Duke Johnson and Isaiah Crowell.

On September 10, 2017, Dayes made his regular season debut and had three carries for seven yards and two receptions for nine yards during a 21–18 loss to the Pittsburgh Steelers. Overall, he had five carries for 13 rushing yards to go along with four receptions for 29 receiving yards in his rookie season.

On September 1, 2018, Dayes was waived by the Browns.

San Francisco 49ers
On October 9, 2018, Dayes was signed to the San Francisco 49ers' practice squad. He was promoted to the active roster on November 12, 2018. He was waived on May 6, 2019.

New Orleans Saints
On May 28, 2019, Dayes signed with the New Orleans Saints. He was waived/injured on August 8 and placed on injured reserve the next day. He was waived from injured reserve on September 10.

References

External links
NC State Wolfpack bio
Cleveland Browns bio

1994 births
Living people
American football running backs
Cleveland Browns players
NC State Wolfpack football players
Players of American football from Fort Lauderdale, Florida
New Orleans Saints players
San Francisco 49ers players